Mythotherapy is a therapeutic method based on psychology, mythology, Cognitive Sciences, CBT, anthropology, philosophy and ancient knowledge and wisdom for therapeutic intentions.


Definition and etymology 

Mythotherapy is an interdisciplinary therapeutic method which uses myths and sacred texts and mythological findings for therapy; and at the same time uses psychology, cognitive sciences, cognitive behavior therapy, anthropology, philosophy and ancient knowledge and wisdom for therapeutic intentions. Mythotherapy is also a method for knowing the self and self-actualization. What is important in mythotherapy is the fundamental realms of human soul and spirit. They are said to contain archetypes as well as an unconscious knowledge and wisdom.

Mytho- is equivalent to the word "myth", from French "mythe" (1818) and originally from "mythus" in Modern Latin. Its older form was the Greek "mythos" which means: speech, thought, story, anything delivered by word of mouth. In Mythotherapy, myth has a broad meaning and refers primarily to mythological texts and secondarily to sacred texts.

Therapy is the medical treatment of disease. Derived from the Modern Latin therapia and from the Greek therapeia meaning, "curing, healing, service done to the sick; a waiting on, service,". Also from the Greek therapeuein meaning "to cure, treat medically," or - perhaps more appropriately here - literally to "attend, do service, take care of".

History 

In ancient cultures using myths and sacred texts as a therapeutic tool was known and applied. They were also used for teaching children how to enter the adult world, especially during initiation ceremonies. Myths had an important role in passing on teachings for knowing the world, its mechanisms, the self, and how one should act in the world.

In the ancient world they used myths to heal disease. In ancient Egypt, for example, to cure an illness a physician who was at the same time a votary would start to narrate a special myth or a narration from a sacred text. This action would heal the person even in physical cases.

In modern psychology it was Carl Gustav Jung that for the first time noted this domain in a very vast, deep and practical way.

In the 1980s Jean Shinoda Bolen, a Jungian psychiatrist, wrote of using myths as a way to discover the inner soul of men and women and a way to reach the unconscious of human.

References

Mind–body interventions
Therapy